Campylocentrum grisebachii is a species of orchid. It is native to Bolivia, Brazil, Argentina and Paraguay.

Description 
This monopodial, epiphytic species of orchid has extremely reduced stems and leaves. The roots are the main photosynthetic organs of the plant. The velamen of the roots has 2-3 separate layers.

References

grisebachii
Orchids of South America
Plants described in 1906
Flora of Brazil
Flora of Bolivia
Flora of Argentina
Flora of Paraguay
Taxa named by Alfred Cogniaux